The 1933–34 United States collegiate men's ice hockey season was the 40th season of collegiate ice hockey in the United States.

Regular season

Standings

References

1933–34 NCAA Standings

External links
College Hockey Historical Archives

1933–34 United States collegiate men's ice hockey season
College